Hart County is a county located in the south central portion of the Commonwealth of Kentucky. As of the 2020 census, the population was 19,288. Its county seat is Munfordville. Its largest city is Horse Cave. Hart County is a prohibition or dry county.

History
Hart County was formed in 1819 from portions of Hardin and Barren counties. The county is named for Captain Nathaniel G. S. Hart, a Kentucky militia officer in the War of 1812 who was wounded at the Battle of Frenchtown and died in the Massacre of the River Raisin.

The Battle of Munfordville, a Confederate victory, was fought in the county in 1862, during the American Civil War.

A courthouse fire in January, 1928 resulted in the loss of some county records.

In 1989 the Amish settlement near Munfordville was founded. It has ties to the Geauga Amish settlement in Ohio, from where many of the Munfordville Amish came. It is the fastest growing Amish settlement in America and had 14 church districts and a total population of about 1,800 people .

Geography

Fauna
A female wolf shot in 2013 in Hart County by a hunter was the first gray wolf seen in Kentucky in modern times.

Adjacent counties
 Hardin County  (north/EST Border)
 LaRue County  (northeast/EST Border)
 Green County  (east)
 Metcalfe County  (southeast)
 Barren County  (south)
 Edmonson County  (southwest)
 Grayson County  (northwest)

Natural features
A portion of Mammoth Cave National Park and the cave for which it is named is located in western Hart County.

Demographics

As of the census of 2000, there were 17,445 people, 6,769 households, and 4,812 families residing in the county. The racial makeup of the county was 92.58% White, 6.20% Black or African American, 0.22% Native American, 0.11% Asian, 0.03% Pacific Islander, 0.18% from other races, and 0.69% from two or more races.  0.86% of the population were Hispanic or Latino of any race.

There were 6,769 households, out of which 32.60% had children under the age of 18 living with them, 56.80% were married couples living together, 10.40% had a female householder with no husband present, and 28.90% were non-families. 25.30% of all households were made up of individuals, and 12.00% had someone living alone who was 65 years of age or older.  The average household size was 2.54 and the average family size was 3.05.

In the county, the population was spread out, with 25.70% under the age of 18, 8.60% from 18 to 24, 28.20% from 25 to 44, 23.50% from 45 to 64, and 13.90% who were 65 years of age or older.  The median age was 37 years. For every 100 females there were 96.90 males.  For every 100 females age 18 and over, there were 93.20 males.

The median income for a household in the county was $25,378, and the median income for a family was $31,746. Males had a median income of $26,994 versus $19,418 for females. The per capita income for the county was $13,495.  About 18.60% of families and 22.40% of the population were below the poverty line, including 28.40% of those under age 18 and 22.00% of those age 65 or over.

Amish settlement
The Amish settlement in Hart County mainly between Munfordville and Horse Cave was founded in 1989. It has ties to the Geauga Amish settlement in Ohio, from where many of the Hart County Amish came. It is the fastest-growing Amish settlement in America and had 14 church districts and a total population of about 1,800 .

Communities

Cities
 Bonnieville
 Horse Cave
 Munfordville (county seat)

Census-designated place
 Hardyville

Other unincorporated places

 Bee
 Big Windy
 Canmer
 Cash
 Cub Run
 Hammonville
 Jonesville
 Legrande
 Linwood
 Lone Star
 Monroe
 Northtown
 Priceville
 Rowletts
 Three Springs
 Uno
 Woodsonville

Politics

Federal
In the U.S House of Representatives, Hart County is represented by Brett Guthrie (R) of the second district.

In presidential elections, Hart County was a swing county up until the 21st century. After that, they have shifted heavily towards the Republican Party. The last Democratic Party presidential candidate to carry the county was Bill Clinton in 1992.

State
In the Kentucky State Senate, all of Hart county is located in the 5th district. It is represented by Stephen Meredith.

In the Kentucky house of representatives all of Hart county is located in the 5th district. It is represented by Bart Rowland.

Education
School districts include:
 Caverna Independent School District
 Hart County School District

See also

 Dry county
 James Greene Hardy Local politician of the 1850s, was Lt. Gov. of Kentucky.
 National Register of Historic Places listings in Hart County, Kentucky

References

 
1819 establishments in Kentucky
Populated places established in 1819
Kentucky counties
Counties of Appalachia